The Nigeria national football team represents Nigeria in men's international football.

2000

2001

2002

2003

2004

2005

2006

2007

2008

2009

Notes

References

External links
 Nigeria: Fixtures and Results – FIFA.com
 Nigeria national football team complete 'A' international record – 11v11.com

2000s in Nigeria
2000-2009
2000–01 in Nigerian football
2001–02 in Nigerian football
2002–03 in Nigerian football
2003–04 in Nigerian football
2004–05 in Nigerian football
2005–06 in Nigerian football
2006–07 in Nigerian football
2007–08 in Nigerian football
2008–09 in Nigerian football
2009–10 in Nigerian football